La Torre de Claramunt is a municipality in the comarca of the Anoia in Catalonia, Spain.

The shoe-making company Munich has its main factory in Vilanova d'Espoia, a village located in La Torre de Claramunt.

References

External links
 Government data pages 

Municipalities in Anoia